George Chambers (1928–1997) was Prime Minister of Trinidad and Tobago.

George Chambers may also refer to:

George Chambers (cricketer, born 1866) (1866–1927), English cricketer
George Chambers (cricketer, born 1884) (1884–1947), English cricketer
George Chambers (New York politician) (1815–1880), New York politician
George Chambers (painter) (1803–1840), British maritime artist
George Chambers (Pennsylvania politician) (1786–1866), U.S. Representative from Pennsylvania
George B. Chambers (1881–1969), English vicar and social activist
George Chambers (born 1931), of The Chambers Brothers
George Frederick Chambers (1841–1915), English barrister, author and amateur astronomer
George Chambers (MP) (1766–?), English soldier, lawyer and Member of Parliament